is a Japanese para table tennis player. She won a bronze medal at the 2000 Summer Paralympics.

Her left hand was cut off at the wrist by an electric animal feed cutter, during an accident when she was five years old.

References

1969 births
Living people
Table tennis players at the 2000 Summer Paralympics
Table tennis players at the 2004 Summer Paralympics
Paralympic medalists in table tennis
Medalists at the 2000 Summer Paralympics
Japanese female table tennis players
Paralympic bronze medalists for Japan
Paralympic table tennis players of Japan
Sportspeople from Kumamoto Prefecture
FESPIC Games competitors
21st-century Japanese women